As defined by the U.S. Office of Management and Budget, and used by the U.S. Census Bureau for statistical purposes only, the Columbia metropolitan statistical area, is an area consisting of six counties in central South Carolina, anchored by the city of Columbia. The current population has an estimation of 837,092. It is the second-largest metropolitan statistical area in the state of South Carolina, since the Anderson metropolitan statistical area was combined with Greenville's following the 2010 census.

Counties
 Calhoun
 Fairfield
 Kershaw
 Lexington
 Richland
 Saluda

Communities

Places with more than 100,000 inhabitants
 Columbia (Principal city)

Places with 50,000 to 100,000 inhabitants

 Pontiac (census county division)

Places with 20,000 to 50,000 inhabitants
 Lexington
 St. Andrews (census-designated place)

Places with 10,000 to 20,000 inhabitants
 Cayce
 Dentsville (census-designated place)
 Forest Acres
 Horrell Hill (census county division)
 Irmo
 Oak Grove (census-designated place)
 Red Bank (census-designated place)
 Seven Oaks (census-designated place)
 West Columbia

Places with 5,000 to 10,000 inhabitants
 Batesburg-Leesville
 Camden
 Lake Murray of Richland (census-designated place)
 Lugoff (census-designated place)
 Woodfield (census-designated place)

Places with 1,000 to 5,000 inhabitants
 Arthurtown (census-designated place)
 Blythewood
 Capitol View (census-designated place)
 Chapin
 Elgin
 Gadsden
 Gaston
 Hopkins (census-designated place)
 Olympia (census-designated place)
 Pelion
 Pine Ridge
 Saluda
 St. Matthews
 South Congaree
 Springdale
 Winnsboro Mills (census-designated place)
 Winnsboro

Places with fewer than 1,000 inhabitants
 Arcadia Lakes
 Bethune
 Cameron
 Eastover
 Gilbert
 Ridge Spring
 Ridgeway
 Summit
 Swansea

Unincorporated places

 Antioch
 Boyden Arbor
 Boykin
 Cassatt
 Creston
 Feasterville
 Fort Motte
 Harbison
 Hilton
 Killian
 Kingville
 Liberty Hill
 Lone Star
 Lykes
 Mitford
 Mount Willing
 Sandy Run
 Spring Hill
 State Park
 Wateree
 Westville
 Windsor Estates

Demographics
As of the census of 2010, there were 767,598 people, 294,881 households, and 193,598 families residing within the MSA. The racial makeup of the MSA was 60.40% White, 33.20% African American, 0.40% Native American, 1.70% Asian, 0.10% Pacific Islander, 2.30% from other races, and 2.00% from two or more races. Hispanic or Latino of any race were 5.10% of the population.

The median income for a household in the MSA was $49,238, and the median income for a family was $61,972. Males had a median income of $43,658 versus $35,891 for females. The per capita income for the MSA was $25,615.

Combined statistical area
The Columbia combined statistical area is made up of seven counties in central South Carolina. The statistical area includes one metropolitan area. As of the 2015 Census estimates, the CSA had a population of 937,288 and is the second-largest CSA in the state.
 Metropolitan statistical areas (MSAs)
 Columbia (Calhoun, Fairfield, Kershaw, Lexington, Richland, and Saluda Counties)
 Micropolitan statistical areas
 Newberry (Newberry County)
 Orangeburg (Orangeburg County)

See also
 South Carolina census statistical areas

References

 
Metropolitan areas of South Carolina